Thesprotia brasiliensis, the Brazilian grass mantis, is a species of mantis native to Brazil.

References

Brasiliensis
Insects of Brazil
Insects described in 1877